David M. Wintour (1 September 1944 – 12 July 2022) was a British bass guitarist and session musician.

Wintour was born on 1 September 1944 in Forest of Dean, Gloucestershire and died on 12 July 2022 in Drumnacross, Kilraine.

Dave Wintour is best known for his active part as a member of  The Wurzels. from 1995 to 2002.

He played and recorded with artists such as Rick Wakeman, Eric Carmen, Pete Atkin, Kenny Young, the pioneer jazz-rock band If, Clifford T. Ward, Roger Daltrey, Slapp Happy, Steve Swindells, Pretty Things, Stealers Wheel, Russ Ballard and Leo Sayer.

He played bass on the song "Dammit Janet" on the 1975 Rocky Horror Picture Show soundtrack.

Wintour died from cancer on 12 July 2022, at the age of 77.

Several songs from The Wurzels, like " The Combine Harvester (Brand New Key)", " The Blackbird"

References

External links

1944 births
2022 deaths
British bass guitarists
Chicken Shack members
If (band) members
Male bass guitarists
Pretty Things members
Musicians from Gloucestershire